Plumlee is a surname. Notable people with the surname include:

 Three American basketball players, all brothers:
Marshall Plumlee (born 1992)
Mason Plumlee (born 1990)
Miles Plumlee (born 1988)
Earl Plumlee, recipient of the Medal of Honor
John Rhys Plumlee (born 2001), American football player
Sybil Plumlee (1911–2012), American police officer

See also
Plumley (surname)